The Benson and Hedges Challenge (also known as "The Perth Challenge" or simply "Perth Challenge" by non-commercial broadcasters such as ABC Local Radio) was a one-off one-day international cricket tournament played at the WACA Ground in Perth, Western Australia from 30 December 1986 to 7 January 1987 as part of the 1987 America's Cup Festival of Sport.

The tournament was won by England who defeated Pakistan by 5 wickets in the final. West Indies and host nation Australia also took part.

This tournament saw the first matches played under floodlights at the WACA Ground with four of the seven matches being day/night games. In addition, the pitch square had been relaid prior to the 1985–86 season and had a full year to settle. The seating areas had been redeveloped with concourse seating installed and a new two-tier grandstand was under construction at the Swan River end of the ground.

The team uniforms for the tournament were based on the official shirts for the 1986-87 America's Cup being held concurrently in Fremantle. Each team's main colour made up the bottom half of the shirt, their secondary colour made up the top half and a white stripe surrounded the shirt over the chest. The official logo of the tournament was based on a 12-metre class yacht with a white cricket ball half doubling as the spinnaker.

Prize money for the tournament was $3,000 for winning and $1,500 for losing in the group stage, $10,000 for finishing runners-up and $20,000 for winning the tournament, making a total of $61,000.

Television coverage was provided by the Nine Network, while commercial free radio broadcasts were provided by ABC Local Radio.

Playing Squads

Australia
Allan Border (captain), Glenn Bishop, David Boon, Simon Davis, Dean Jones, Craig McDermott, Ken MacLeay, Geoff Marsh, Greg Matthews, Simon O'Donnell, Bruce Reid, Steve Waugh, Mike Whitney, Tim Zoehrer

England
Mike Gatting (captain), Bill Athey, Ian Botham, Chris Broad, Phillip DeFreitas, Graham Dilley, Phil Edmonds, John Emburey, Neil Foster, David Gower, Allan Lamb, Jack Richards, Gladstone Small

Pakistan
Imran Khan (captain), Asif Mujtaba, Ijaz Ahmed, Javed Miandad, Manzoor Elahi, Mudassar Nazar, Qasim Omar, Rameez Raja, Saleem Jaffar, Saleem Yousuf, Shoaib Mohammad, Wasim Akram

West Indies
Viv Richards (captain), Winston Benjamin, Jeff Dujon, Joel Garner, Larry Gomes, Tony Gray, Gordon Greenidge, Roger Harper, Desmond Haynes, Michael Holding, Gus Logie, Malcolm Marshall, Richie Richardson, Courtney Walsh

Match results
All matches played at WACA Ground, Perth. For full scorecards, follow this link

1st match

2nd match

3rd match

4th match

5th match

6th match

Final

Javed Miandad was named by Rod Marsh as the Benson and Hedges Challenge Champion (the name given to the Player of the Match in the Final) and was awarded an 18ct gold Longines Conquest watch, then valued at $15 000.

Tournament Highlights
Pakistan's shock win over the West Indies in the opening match of the Challenge
Ian Botham hitting Australian fast-medium bowler Simon Davis for 26 runs in an over
John Emburey catching Ken MacLeay at long-on overhead, one-handed and falling backwards. The catch was named as Channel Nine's Classic Catch of 1986-87
Dean Jones scoring centuries on consecutive days against England and Pakistan
Dean Jones and Steve Waugh adding 173 for the 4th wicket against Pakistan, then an Australian ODI 4th wicket record
Asif Mujtaba guiding Pakistan from 6 for 129 to 9 for 274 against Australia
England defeating a full-strength West Indies side to ensure an England-Pakistan final with two group matches to spare
Gordon Greenidge scoring his first international century in Australia

The Challenge was England's second tournament victory of the 1986-87 Australian summer. They had retained The Ashes at the Melbourne Cricket Ground on 28 December 1986 and would go on to win the Benson and Hedges World Series Cup against Australia and West Indies.

References

External links
 Cricinfo scorecards for the B&H Perth Challenge
 AUS v ENG,1986-87 Perth Challenge Game 2  - YouTube

1986 in Pakistani cricket
1986 in West Indian cricket
1986–87 Australian cricket season
1987 in Australian cricket
1987 in English cricket
1987 in Pakistani cricket
1987 in West Indian cricket
International cricket competitions from 1985–86 to 1988
1986-87
One Day International cricket competitions
1986-87
Sport in Perth, Western Australia
1986-87